Kula Deivam is a 1956 Indian Tamil-language drama film directed by Krishnan–Panju and written by Murasoli Maran. It is a remake of the 1954 Bengali film Banga Kora. The film stars S. V. Sahasranamam and Pandari Bai, while Rajagopal, S. S. Rajendran, Chandrababu, S. A. Ashokan and Vijayakumari play supporting roles. The film's soundtrack and background score were composed by R. Sudarsanam. Maruthi Rao and Panju (under the alias S. Panjabi) handled cinematography and editing respectively.

Kula Deivam was released on 29 September 1956, and became a commercial success, winning the National Film Award for Best Feature Film in Tamil. Banga Kora went on to be remade in Hindi as Bhabhi and in Kannada as Jenu Goodu. Pandari Bai reprised her role in both the versions.

Plot

Cast 

Male cast
 S. V. Sahasranamam as Muthaiah
 S. S. Rajendran as Rajaiah
 M. K. Mustafa as Muthaiah
 V. R. Rajagopal as Chinnaiah
 D. Balasubramaniam as Kannappan
 T. R. Natarajan as Jeeva
 Duraisami as Karmegham
 Master Murali as Kanmani
 Chandrababu as Babu
 A. Karunanidhi as Latha's brother-in-law
 S. A. Ashokan as Doctor

Female cast
 M. Pandari Bai as Shantha
 M. N. Rajam as Thara
 C. R. Vijayakumari as Mangalam
 M. Mynavathi as Latha
 M. R. Santhanalakshmi
 P. S. Gnanam as Muthaiah's aunt
 K. S. Angamuthu as Neighbor
 D. Indira as Nalina
Dance
 Kumari Kamala

Male support cast
 P. S. Venkatachalam, Sethu, Kottapuli Jayaraman, A. S. Kannan, Ganapathi, Thiruvenkatam, Kittan and Pottai Krishnamoorthy.

Production 
Kula Deivam was remade from the 1954 Bengali film Banga Kora. It was directed by the duo Krishnan–Panju, and the dialogues were written by Murasoli Maran, making his cinematic debut. Stage actor V. R. Rajagopal, who appeared in this film, later adapted the film's title as a prefix to his name.

Soundtrack 
Soundtrack was composed by R. Sudharsanam and lyrics were written by Mahakavi Subramania Bharathiyar, Bharathidasan, Pattukkottai Kalyanasundaram, K. P. Kamatchi and M. K. Athmanathan. A Kriti composed by Oothukadu Venkata Subbaiyer, Thaaye Yasodha Undhan, was included in the film for a dance sequence of Kumari Kamala.

Release 
Kula Deivam was released on 29 September 1956, delayed from a 20 September release. The film was a commercial success, and ran for over 100 days in theatres. Randor Guy of The Hindu noted that the film was "Remembered for the socially relevant storyline, excellent performances by Sahasranamam and Pandari Bai, pleasing music and touching on-screen narration".  The film won National Film Award for Best Feature Film in Tamil.

References

External links 

1950s Tamil-language films
1956 drama films
1956 films
AVM Productions films
Films directed by Krishnan–Panju
Films scored by R. Sudarsanam
Indian black-and-white films
Indian drama films
Tamil remakes of Bengali films